Notogomphus lujai is a species of dragonfly in the family Gomphidae. It is found in the Republic of the Congo, the Democratic Republic of the Congo, Kenya, Tanzania, and Uganda. Its natural habitats are subtropical or tropical moist lowland forests and rivers.

References

Gomphidae
Taxonomy articles created by Polbot
Insects described in 1934